Cooktown, Queensland is a town on Cape York Peninsula in Far North Queensland, Queensland, Australia.

Cooktown may refer to:
Cooktown, Georgia, a community in Miller County, Georgia
Cooktown, Kentucky, a community in Barren County, Kentucky
Cooktown, Virginia, a community in Fairfax County, Virginia

See also
Cookstown (disambiguation)